The Triple Entente describes the informal understanding between the Russian Empire, the French Third Republic and the United Kingdom of Great Britain and Ireland. It formed a powerful counterweight to the Central Powers of Germany, Austria-Hungary, and Ottoman Empire. The conquest of many of these regions created resentment against the Entente colonial governments. Many of these regions had former uprisings or were in a constant state of rebellion.

When World War I broke out in late 1914 many communities saw it as their chance to overthrow the local colonial Entente governments. This was further pushed along on 14 November 1914 when the religious leaders of the Ottoman Empire declared a holy war or jihad against the Entente powers.

Australia

Africa

North Africa

British India

Europe

Middle East

Bibliography 
Notes

References 

 - Total pages: 376
 - Total pages: 262
 - Total pages: 1,354
 - Total pages: 2,128

 - Total pages: 272

 - Total pages: 1,254
 - Total pages: 492

Uprisings during World War I